CityFlyer or Cityflyer may refer to:

BA CityFlyer, an airline subsidiary based in the United Kingdom
CityFlyer Express, a defunct airline based in the United Kingdom
Cityflyer (bus service), an airport coach service in Hong Kong
CityFlyer (Thameslink), a former train service run by Thameslink